Mount Pisgah (in French: Mont Pisgah) is a mountain on the border between the Canadian province of Quebec, in the region of Estrie, and the American state of Maine (United States United), which is part of the Appalachian Mountains; it rises to  of altitude.

Geography 

The mountain, located in part in the municipality of Saint-Augustin-de-Woburn, southeast of lac aux Araignées, is crossed by the Canada-United States border.

Toponymy
The toponym "Mont Pisgah" was formalized on December 5, 1968, by the Commission de toponymie du Québec.

Notes and references 

Appalachian summits
Mountains of Franklin County, Maine
Summits of Estrie
Le Granit Regional County Municipality
Canada–United States border
One-thousanders of Quebec